Manuel Serafim Monteiro Pereira (25 July 1943 – 7 June 1994) was a Portuguese footballer who played as forward.

External links

1943 births
1994 deaths
Portuguese footballers
Association football forwards
Primeira Liga players
FC Porto players
S.L. Benfica footballers
Associação Académica de Coimbra – O.A.F. players
Portugal youth international footballers
Portugal under-21 international footballers
Portugal international footballers
People from Gondomar, Portugal
Sportspeople from Porto District